Lord Darcy may refer to:

Lord Darcy (character), a detective in an alternate history, created by Randall Garrett
Lord Darcy Investigates, a collection of short stories by Randall Garrett featuring his alternate history detective Lord Darcy
Lord Darcy (omnibus), a 1983 omnibus collection of two previous fantasy collections and one fantasy novel by Randall Garrett

See also
Baron Darcy (disambiguation)